Goran Savić (born 1971) is a politician and administrator in Serbia. He briefly served in the Assembly of Vojvodina in 2016 as a member of the Serbian Progressive Party. Since 2016, he has been the director of the Government Fund of Vojvodina.

Private career
Savić is a graduated economist. He is from Golubinci in the municipality of Stara Pazova.

Politician
Savić has been vice-president of the Progressive Party's municipal board in Stara Pazova.

He received the thirty-fourth position on the Progressive Party's Let's Get Vojvodina Moving electoral list in the 2012 Vojvodina provincial election. The list won only fourteen mandates, and he was not elected. He later served as assistant to the mayor of Stara Pazova with responsibility for economic development and strategic marketing.

Savić was given the fifty-sixth position on the Progressive-led list in the 2016 provincial election and was elected when the list won a majority victory with sixty-three out of 120 mandates. He was appointed to the assembly committee on national equality, the committee for education and science, and the committee on petitions and proposals.

His term in the assembly was, however, very brief. He resigned on 22 July 2016, having been appointed as director of the Government Fund of Vojvodina.

Savić is still the director of the fund as of 2021.

References

1971 births
Living people
People from Stara Pazova
Members of the Assembly of Vojvodina
Serbian Progressive Party politicians